Liteni may refer to several places in Romania:

Liteni, a town in Suceava County
Liteni, a village in Săvădisla Commune, Cluj County
Liteni, a village in Belcești Commune, Iaşi County
Liteni, a village in Moara Commune, Suceava County